Mercy Dee Walton (born Mercy Davis Walton, August 30, 1915 – December 2, 1962) was an American jump blues pianist, singer and songwriter, whose compositions went from blues to R&B numbers. According to journalist Tony Russell in his book The Blues - From Robert Johnson to Robert Cray, "Walton created a series of memorable blues about the unattractiveness of rural life, sardonically aimed at the black migrant workers in southern California who constituted his typical audience".

Biography
Born in Waco, Texas, he moved to California just before World War II. He started playing piano at age 13 and learned his style from many of the ten-cent party house pianists that played out in the country on weekends. To make ends meet, he had to earn his living in the fields chopping cotton, picking grapes or cutting spinach. During this time, the musician who impressed Walton the most was Delois Maxey, who never had an opportunity to record. In 1949, Walton made his first record for the small record label, Spire Records in Fresno. The track was "Lonesome Cabin Blues". Shortly after that, he had a national hit on Specialty Records with "One Room Country Shack", now considered a blues standard. After that success, he was able to start working as a musician full-time, and he toured with the jump blues band of Big Jay McNeely.

A half dozen tracks recorded for the Flair Records label in 1955, included "Come Back Maybellene," a sequel to Chuck Berry's then-current hit, "Maybellene".

In 1961, Arhoolie Records released an album recorded in Stockton, California, entitled Mercy Dee. Featured with him was Sidney Maiden on harmonica, K. C. Douglas on electric guitar and Otis Cherry playing the drums.

Walton died of a cerebral hemorrhage in Murphys, California, the following year.

Single discography

"Lonesome Cabin Blues (a.k.a. "Log Cabin Blues") / Baba-Du-Lay Fever (a.k.a. "G.I. Fever") (Spire) 1949
"Evil And Hanky" / Travelin' Alone Blues" (Spire) 1949
"Homely Baby" / "Empty Life" (Imperial) 1950
"Big Foot Country" / "Bird Brain Baby" (Imperial) 1950
"Roamin' Blues" / "Bought Love" (Imperial) 1950
"Danger Zone" / "Pay Off" (a.k.a. "Anything In The World") (Imperial) 1950
"Happy Bachelor" / "Straight And Narrow" (Colony) (1950)
"Old Fashioned Ways" / "Pay Off" (a.k.a. "Anything In The World") (Colony) 1950
"Please Understand" / "Pay Off" (a.k.a. "Anything In The World") (Bayou) 1950
"One Room Country Shack" / "My Woman Knows The Score" (Specialty) 1953
"Rent Man Blues / Fall Guy (Specialty) 1953
"Dark Muddy Bottom" / "Get To Gettin'" (Specialty) 1953
"Trailing My Baby" / "The Main Event" (Rhythm) 1954
"Romp And Stomp Blues" / "Oh Oh Please" (Flair) 1955
"Come Back Maybellene" / "True Love" (Flair) 1955
"Have You Ever" / "Stubborn Woman" (Flair) 1955
"Lady Luck" / "Betty Jean" (Arhoolie) 1961

References

External links
[  AllMusic biography]

1915 births
1962 deaths
American blues pianists
American male pianists
Songwriters from Texas
People from Waco, Texas
Flair Records artists
Jump blues musicians
20th-century American singers
20th-century American pianists
20th-century American male singers
Arhoolie Records artists
American male songwriters